Kinyongia matschiei, common name giant monkey-tailed east Usambara two-horned chameleon, giant east Usambara blade-horned chameleon, and Matschie's two-horned chameleon, is a species of chameleon from the East Usambara Mountains in Tanzania. It was formerly confused with K. fischeri, which is not found in the range of K. matschiei.

Distribution
This species lives only at altitudes of up to 1500 metres over a total of 800 km2 of isolated Afrotemperate forest areas in the East Usambara Mountains of Tanzania. The actual area of occupancy, however, is under 300 km2. Its numbers are declining. It is not found in transformed areas such as plantations. The related K. vosseleri occurs in the same range as K. matschiei, while K. multituberculata is found in the West Usambaras.

References

External links

Kinyongia
Lizards of Africa
Endemic fauna of Tanzania
Reptiles of Tanzania
Reptiles described in 1895
Taxa named by Franz Werner